Andrew Nicholas Edwards (born 12 November 1978) is a former English cricketer.  Edwards was a right-handed batsman who bowled right-arm off break.  He was born in Delft, Netherlands.

Edwards made his debut in List A cricket for the Gloucestershire Cricket Board against the Yorkshire Cricket Board in the 1999 NatWest Trophy.  From 1999 to 2001, he represented the Board in 2 further List A matches.  These came against the Nottinghamshire Cricket Board and the Yorkshire Cricket Board, both in the 2000 NatWest Trophy.

In 1999, Edwards also made his debut for Herefordshire in the Minor Counties Championship against Devon.  In 2001, he played 3 further Championship matches for the county, the last of which came against Berkshire.  In 2001, he played a single MCCA Knockout Trophy match for Herefordshire against the Warwickshire Cricket Board.  Edwards also represented the county in List A cricket, making his debut for the county in that format against the Gloucestershire Cricket Board in the 2001 Cheltenham & Gloucester Trophy.  He played 2 further matches in that season's competition against Middlesex, who they famously defeated by 3 wickets, and Worcestershire.

In his career total of 6 List A matches, he scored 96 runs at a batting average of 24.00, with a high score of 38.  In the field he took 2 catches.  With the ball he took 5 wickets at a bowling average of 25.80, with best figures of 3/38.

Father
His father, Gordon, played first-class and List A cricket for Nottinghamshire in 1973.

References

External links
Andrew Edwards at Cricinfo
Andrew Edwards at CricketArchive

1978 births
Living people
Sportspeople from Delft
English cricketers
Herefordshire cricketers
Gloucestershire Cricket Board cricketers